Jayant Rajora is an Indian Inline Speed Skater who represented India in World Roller Games Championship 2017, held at Nanjing, China.

Early life and education
He has completed Graduation and Post Graduation from Delhi University in sports science.

Competitions

Event specialty & performance
 Track Elimination Race (15000 meters)
 Track Points Race (10000 meters)
 Road Elimination Race (20000 meters)
 Road Points Race (10000 meters)

Medical history
 Neuro-Surgery due to injury during training session, 2010
 Tibial wound, 2018

See also 

 Inline Skating
 Roller Skating Federation of India

References 

Sportspeople from Delhi
1994 births
Living people
Inline speed skaters